The 2002–03 IUPUI Jaguars men's basketball team represented Indiana University–Purdue University Indianapolis during the 2002–03 NCAA Division I men's basketball season. The Jaguars, led by 9th-year head coach Ron Hunter, played their home games at Indiana Farmers Coliseum in Indianapolis, Indiana as members of the Mid-Continent Conference. They finished the season 20–14, 10–4 in conference play to finish in a tie for second place. The Jaguars then won the Mid-Con tournament to receive an automatic bid to the NCAA tournament  the first appearance in school history. Playing as the No. 16 seed in the Midwest region, they lost to No. 1 seed Kentucky in the opening round.

Roster 

Source

Schedule and results

|-
!colspan=9 style=| Regular season

|-
!colspan=9 style=| Mid-Con tournament

|-
!colspan=9 style=| NCAA tournament

|-

Source

References

IUPUI Jaguars men's basketball seasons
IUPUI Jaguars
IUPUI
IUPUI Jaguars men's basketball
IUPUI Jaguars men's basketball